Fauske Lysverk is a private power company that operates the power grid in Fauske, Norway with 6,000 customers and 440 kilometers of grid. The company does not have any of its own power production. The largest owner is the municipality (44.64%), Bodø Energi (12.4%) and Salten Kraftsamband. Fauske Lysverk was founded in 1913. As of May 2004 the number of shareholders in the company were 552.

Electric power companies of Norway
Companies based in Nordland
Energy companies established in 1913
1913 establishments in Norway
Renewable resource companies established in 1913